The Webb County Courthouse is located in Laredo in the U.S. state of Texas. It was added to the National Register of Historic Places in 1981.

Design
In 1907, Webb County placed ads in local newspapers announcing a contest to design a new courthouse. Famed San Antonio architect Alfred Giles submitted the winning bid on February 27, 1907. The courthouse was completed in 1909 for $46,918.

The Beaux-Arts building features a curved judge's bench. A stained glass window features "Justice" holding the scales. Tile floors are in the Mediterranean style. Alamo Iron Works produced the wrought iron staircases. Interior doors are solid wood  with brass knobs. Mansard roofed terminal pavilions feature stone-carved rams head accents. The building features yellow brick with dressings of white stone and red tile mansard roofs. The landscaping includes pecan trees and citrus trees. A cornerstone records the contractor, H. Sparbert, and architect, Alfred Giles, 1909. 

Many of Alfred Giles' buildings have been demolished over the years. This fine example of his work shows why he continues to have the respect of architects, historians, and laymen alike.

In November 2010, the county held an art contest to commemorate the 100th anniversary of the courthouse. County Judge Danny Valdez and Javier Santos of the Fernando A. Salinas Charitable Trust Fund unveiled the winning design on November 12, 2010. The winning design was submitted by Jocelyn Rivera, and became a stained glass window on the third floor of the courthouse.

See also

National Register of Historic Places listings in Webb County, Texas
List of county courthouses in Texas

References

External links

Government buildings completed in 1909
Buildings and structures in Webb County, Texas
County courthouses in Texas
Courthouses on the National Register of Historic Places in Texas
National Register of Historic Places in Webb County, Texas